The Marlboro Pike Line, designated Route J12, is a daily bus route operated by the Washington Metropolitan Area Transit Authority between the Addison Road station of the Blue & Silver Lines of the Washington Metro & Forestville (8431 Old Marlboro Pike). The line operates every 35 minutes during peak hours, and 70 minutes during midday and on the weekends. J12 trips are roughly 28–35 minutes long. Rush hours route J12 trips are extended to the Machinists Place Building which takes roughly 45 minutes.

Background
Route J12 operates between the Addison Road station & Forestville (8431 Old Marlboro Pike) from 4:25 am to 11:30 pm on weekdays and 6:15 am to 10:00 pm on weekends every 35 minutes during peak hours and 70 minutes during the off-peak hours. J12 originally operated out of the Southern Avenue Annex division (formerly known as the, "Prince George's" division prior to 1989), along with the J11, J13, J14, and J15 up until February 1989, when the Landover division opened. Once Landover opened, all routes were all shifted to operate out of the Landover division. J11, J13, J14 and J15 operated out of Landover division up until the times

they were discontinued (J14 & J15 on December 18, 2004), and (J11 & J13 in 2016) was shifted to operate out of Andrews Federal Center division on June 23, 2019.

J12 stops

History

Initial background
J12 began operation in 1925 and initially operated as part of the Marlboro Pike streetcar line between Federal Triangle in Downtown Washington D.C. & Andrews Air Force Base in Camp Springs, MD. J12 was later converted into a bus route during the 1950s, before ultimately becoming a WMATA Metrobus Route on February 4, 1973, when WMATA acquired four private bus companies that operated throughout the Washington D.C. Metropolitan Area. J12 begin serving Potomac Avenue & Eastern Market stations, once they opened on July 15, 1977, in the middle of its already existing route.

1978 Changes
On September 25, 1978, J12 was truncated to only operate between Potomac Avenue station & Andrews Air Force Base during the times the Blue Line operated. J12 would still continue to make one early morning and late night trip that operated all the way between the Federal Triangle & Andrews Air Force Base  during the e times the Blue Line did not operate.

1981 Changes
On January 4, 1981, route J12 was truncated even further to only operate between the Addison Road station & Andrews Air Force Base. During this same exact time, WMATA created its brand new J11, J13, J14 and J15 Metrobus Routes.

J13 would be the new route designation of the original J12 route which basically operated all the way from Andrews Air Force Base up to Federal Triangle during non-Metrorail times prior January 4, 1981.

J11 would also operate between Addison Road station and Andrews Air Force Base, just like J12, only with the exception that it would only operate during mid-day times during weekdays unlike J12 which operated as an all-day route, seven days a week. Also, unlike J12, J11 would travel south on Pennsylvania Avenue past the intersection of Suitland Parkway towards the intersection of Machinists Place and then make a u-turn loop onto Machinists Place to get back onto Pennsylvania Avenue, before returning to Suitland Parkway and entering the Andrews Air Force Base gates, via Patrick Avenue. However; during weekday early morning weekday times before Metrorail Service began operation, J11 would operate on special southbound trips in the exact opposite direction of J13, from Federal Triangle towards Andrews Air Force Base, bypassing Addison Road station altogether.

J14 & J15 operated between Addison Road station & Ritchie, via Addison Road, Central Avenue, Larchmont Avenue, Marlboro Pike, Kipling Parkway, Ritchie Road, Ashwood Drive, Dunmore Place, Edgeworth Drive, Central Avenue (J15), Brightseat Road (J15), CentrePointe Office Park (J15), Hampton Mall (J15), and Hampton Park Boulevard (J15). Both routes J14 & J15 would operate all day service on weekdays, in a counterclockwise manner, meaning in the exact opposite directions of each other. Route J14 would only operate during midday hours while J15 operated during the weekday peak hours in the peak direction.

2001 Changes
On January 13, 2001, when the Green Line extension to Branch Avenue was complete, routes J11, J12, & J13 were rerouted to operate to between Potomac Avenue station (J11 rush hour trips only, J13)/Addison Road station J11 & J12 only & Forestville (8411 Old Marlboro Pike) instead of Andrews Air Force Base, by diverting from the intersection of Forestville Road onto the intersection of Pennsylvania Avenue and then J12 & J13, making a turn onto the intersection of Old Marlboro Pike to reach the Forestville terminus. Route J11 would continue to still operate by diverting onto the intersection of Pennsylvania Avenue and turn onto the intersection of Presidential Parkway/Machinists Place to serve the Machinists Place building.

The segment of Routes J11, J12, & J13's routing on Forestville Road between the intersections of Suitland Parkway & Allentown Road, the intersection of Forestville Road & Andrews Air Force Base Gates, were replaced by both Routes K11 & K12, which were extended from their original terminus to terminate at the newly opened Branch Avenue station.

In October, 2001, due to heightened security at the Andrews Air Force Base, in response to the 9/11 terror attacks that took place, J11, J12, and J13 were no longer allowed to enter inside the Andrews Air Force Base gates (located on Patrick Avenue just off Suitland Parkway),  to serve their original terminus at Andrews Air Force Base. As a result, J11, J12, and J13 were truncated to only operate to Forestville (8431 Old Marlboro Pike) instead. Neither J14, nor J15 were affected by this route change since they did not operate to, or anywhere near Andrews Air Force Base. However; due to the sudden, unexpected nature of these route changes, WMATA was not able to update its J11, J12, J13, J14, & J15 Marlboro Pike Line Schedule, to reflect those route changes until June 30, 2002

2004 Changes
On December 18, 2004, when Morgan Boulevard & Largo Town Center stations opened, routes J14 & J15 were discontinued and replaced by Prince George's County "TheBus" Route 24. Prince George's County The Bus Route 24 was extended from its original terminus at District Heights, to operate up to the newly opened Morgan Boulevard station, via Kipling Parkway, Ritchie Road, Ashwood Drive, Dunmore Place, Edgeworth Drive, Ritchie Road, Central Avenue, Hampton Mall, Hampton Park Boulevard, and Brightseat Road. Despite this route change, Prince George's County The Bus Route 24 still kept operating on the segment of its route by the Penn Mar Shopping Center in Forestville, MD.

2007 Changes
On June 24, 2007, as the Blue Line began operating earlier in the morning on weekdays, northbound J13 trips operating from Forestville towards Federal Triangle as well as a special southbound J11 trip operating back from Federal Triangle towards Forestville (basically operating on the same exact routing as J13, but in the exact opposite direction, remaining straight on Marlboro Pike, bypassing the Addison Road Metro Station altogether) were discontinued.

Additionally, the special Saturday early morning J13 southbound trip from Potomac Avenue station towards Forestville, as well as a special Sunday early morning J13 northbound trip from Forestville to Federal Triangle, were discontinued, as Metrorail Service began operating during those times. As a result of these changes, the segment of J13's weekday and Sunday early morning northbound and southbound routing between the Potomac Avenue & Federal Triangle, via Eastern Market and Archives stations, was discontinued. Route J13, only operated one special early morning Saturday trip in only the northbound direction from Forestville to the Potomac Avenue. J13 service on weekday and Sunday early mornings, were discontinued. The segment of J11's special weekday early morning routing between Federal Triangle and the intersection of Marlboro Pike & Larchmont Avenue in Coral Hills was also discontinued.

2016 Changes
On June 26, 2016, both routes J11 & J13 were discontinued and fully replaced by route J12. Peak hour route J11 trips to Machinists Place Building were renamed route J12,

References

J12